Carlos Abdala (1930–1976) was a Uruguayan politician and diplomat.
He served as Minister of Labour and Social Affairs. Later he was appointed Ambassador in Paraguay, a country where he was mistakingly assassinated by a  Croatian Revolutionary Brotherhood terrorists. 

His son Pablo is currently a national representative.

References

1930 births
1976 deaths
Politicians from Montevideo
Uruguayan people of Lebanese descent
National Party (Uruguay) politicians
Ministers of Labor and Social Affairs of Uruguay
Ambassadors of Uruguay to Paraguay
People murdered in Paraguay
Assassinated diplomats
Assassinated Uruguayan politicians
Croatian nationalist terrorism